Pots of Gold (lit. I Summon You, Gold! or Gold, Appear!) is a 2013 South Korean television series starring Han Ji-hye, Yeon Jung-hoon, Lee Tae-sung, Lee Soo-kyung, Baek Jin-hee, Park Seo-joon and Kim Hyung-jun. It aired on MBC from April 6 to September 22, 2013 on Saturdays and Sundays at 20:40 for 50 episodes.

The drama explores love, marriage and divorce through a case of mistaken identity, while making good-humored fun of a middle class family and their pretensions.

Plot
Mong-hee and Yoo-na are two different women who look exactly the same, so much so they could be twins. Mong-hee is a cheerful and hardworking street vendor who sells accessories and dreams of becoming a jewelry designer. On the other hand, Yoo-na is the cold daughter-in-law of a wealthy chaebol family.

Yoo-na has just gone through a divorce with Park Hyun-soo. Hyun-soo's parents own a jewelry company, which he is due to inherit as the eldest son. But his younger brother Hyun-joon wants the CEO position for himself, and he schemes to gain control of the family business, along with his wife, Sung-eun, a successful jewelry designer. When Hyun-soo meets Mong-hee, he gets a real chance to find love and happiness, but the fact that she looks exactly like his ex-wife might become a problem, as he asks her to pose as his wife. Mong-hee soon finds herself caught up in a power struggle within the Park family and also discovers the tragedy behind her and Yoo-na's births.

Cast

Main characters
Han Ji-hye as Jung Mong-hee / Son Yoo-na
A gifted jewelry designer, Mong-hee is the eldest child of Jung Byung-hoo and Yoon Shim-deok. Due to her family's precarious financial situation and having two younger siblings, she was forced to drop out of college so that her siblings could attend. She meets the Park family as her mother is a long-time employee of their company and soon uncovers the tragic secret behind her and Yoo-na's births.
Yoo-na is the wife of Park Hyun-soo. She is a chaebol heiress who was arranged to marry him in a politically and financially-motivated union. Having grown up in a wealthy but uncaring environment, she has difficulty empathizing with others and her cold and aloof mannerisms puts off those around her, leading to her feeling lonely and depressed.
Yeon Jung-hoon as Park Hyun-soo
The eldest son of Park Soon-sang who is due to succeed his father as the CEO. His biological mother Jin-sook (Soon-sang's ex-wife) was thrown out of the house for allegedly having an extramarital affair and Hyun-soo grew up under his father's live-in mistress and de facto stepmother Jang Deok-hee, the domineering and manipulative biological mother of his younger half-brother Hyun-joon. 
Lee Tae-sung as Park Hyun-joon
The ambitious son of Soon-sang and Deok-hee who works for the family company. He and his wife were constantly scheming of ways to take over the company from Hyun-soo. Being an illegitimate child, he always felt like he was in the shadows of his older brother and tries hard to win his father's approval. His ambitious mother would stop at nothing in pressuring him to climb up the ladder at work but unlike her, Hyun-joon also values his relationship with his brothers and his marriage to Sung-eun and has to toe a very thin line between power and family.
Lee Soo-kyung as Min Sung-eun
Mong-hee's rival from their college days and Head of Design at her husband's family company. She had been harboring a secret from her husband and Mong-hee's appearance could mean that the secret would be exposed.
Baek Jin-hee as Jung Mong-hyun
The youngest of Byung-hoo and Shim-deok's three children. She initially dates wealthy playboy Hyun-tae merely to satisfy her mother's desire for her to marry into a chaebol family but they eventually fall in love and get married. Her kind nature and simple lifestyle contrasts starkly with that of her sophisticated and often aloof sisters-in-law.
Park Seo-joon as Park Hyun-tae
The carefree and happy-go-lucky youngest son of Park Soon-sang. His biological mother Min Young-ae, another of Sang-soon's mistresses, chose to send him to live with his father for financial reasons and better prospects. While growing up he learned to keep a low profile so that he won't be thrown out by Deok-hee, who despises him and treats him coldly. He is coddled by his father and older brothers and longs to experience life outside of the wealthy upper-class circle that his family belongs to.
Kim Hyung-jun as Jung Mong-kyu
Byung-hoo and Shim-deok's only son who has graduated from college but is still jobless. Much to his parents' chagrin, he continues to be half-hearted and directionless when job-hunting and relies on his mother for pocket money. Eventually circumstances force him to take responsibility for his own actions.

Supporting characters
Mong-hee's family
Choi Myung-gil as Yoon Shim-deok
Kil Yong-woo as Jung Byung-hoo, Shim-deok's husband
Ban Hyo-jung as Kim Pil-nyeo, Byung-hoo's mother 
Choi Ju-bong as Jung Pan-geum, husband of Pil-nyeo
Kim Ji-young as Choi Kwang-soon, Shim-deok's mother
Kim Kwang-kyu as Jung Byung-dal, Byung-hoo's younger brother
Jo Eun-sook as Haeng-ja, Byung-dal's wife
Kim Dan-yul as Jung Doo-ri, Byung-dal and Haeng-ja's son

Hyun-soo's family
Han Jin-hee as Park Soon-sang, family patriarch and CEO of Noble Diamond
Lee Kyung-jin as Jin-sook, Hyun-soo's biological mother and Soon-sang's first wife
Lee Hye-sook as Jang Deok-hee, biological mother of Soon-sang's second son Hyun-joon who is constantly scheming of ways to secure power and helping her son get ahead
Geum Bo-ra as Min Young-ae, biological mother of Soon-sang's third son Hyun-tae who is "frenemies" with her rival Deok-hee

Extended cast
Park Min-ha as Jin Ah-ram
Han Bo-reum as Lee Min-ah
Kim Da-hyun as Jin Sang-chul
Lee Ga-ryeong as Customer of cosmetics store
Kim Ye-won as Kwak Min-jung, Mong-kyu's girlfriend
Jeon Soo-kyeong

Awards and nominations

International broadcast
It aired in Thailand on PPTV beginning July 25, 2014 and also aired in Myanmar on MNTV. The show aired in Singapore on Channel U starting of August 2015.

References

External links
Pots of Gold official MBC website 
Pots of Gold at MBC Global Media

Korean-language television shows
2013 South Korean television series debuts
2013 South Korean television series endings
MBC TV television dramas
South Korean romance television series
South Korean comedy television series
Television series by Victory Contents